The Price of Tea in China is the second collaborative studio album by American rapper Boldy James and American DJ and producer The Alchemist. It was released on February 7, 2020 under ALC Records.

Accolades

Track listing

Notes
 "S.N.O.R.T." features additional vocals by Earl Sweatshirt
"Giant Slide" features additional vocals by Helios Hussain

References

2020 albums
Boldy James albums
Albums produced by the Alchemist (musician)
Collaborative albums